CD2 (cluster of differentiation 2) is a cell adhesion molecule found on the surface of T cells and natural killer (NK) cells.  
It has also been called T-cell surface antigen T11/Leu-5, LFA-2, LFA-3 receptor, erythrocyte receptor and rosette receptor.

Function 
It interacts with other adhesion molecules, such as lymphocyte function-associated antigen-3 (LFA-3/CD58) in humans, or CD48 in rodents, which are expressed on the surfaces of other cells.

In addition to its adhesive properties, CD2 also acts as a co-stimulatory molecule on T and NK cells.

Diagnostic relevance 

CD2 is a specific marker for T cells and NK cells, and can therefore be used in immunohistochemistry to identify the presence of such cells in tissue sections. The great majority of T cell lymphomas and leukaemias also express CD2, making it possible to use the presence of the antigen to distinguish these conditions from B cell neoplasms.

Classification 

Due to its structural characteristics, CD2 is a member of the immunoglobulin superfamily; it possesses two immunoglobulin-like domains in its extracellular portion.

Interactions 

CD2 has been shown to interact with CD2BP2, Lck and PSTPIP1.

References

Further reading

External links 
 
 Mouse CD Antigen Chart
 Human CD Antigen Chart
 

Clusters of differentiation